Achille Sannia (14 April 1822 – 2 August 1892) was an Italian mathematician and politician.

Biography

Achille Sannia was a senator of the Kingdom of Italy.  He was born in Campobasso and later moved from Molise to Naples to continue his studies together with Enrico D'Ovidio. 
He first taught in a private school before moving to a University in 1865 as a professor of geometry.

In 1871, he created a school of Electrical engineering. He wrote two important treatises, one concerning projective geometry and the other elementary geometry. He was a member of the Academy of Sciences.

He had a son, Gustavo Sannia who was also a mathematician.

Works

Planimetry, with Enrico D'Ovidio, Stab. typ. of the fine arts, Naples 1869, II ed. 1871
Geometry elements, with Enrico D'Ovidio, (14 editions), Naples 1868-69, 12th edition, B. Pellerano LC Scientific and Industrial Library successor, Naples 1906
Projection Geometry Lessons dictated in the Royal University of Naples by Prof. Achille Sannia- Ed. Pellerano Naples 1891 of 691pagg.

References 

20th-century Italian politicians
Members of the Senate of the Kingdom of Italy
20th-century Italian mathematicians
Recipients of the Order of the Crown (Italy)
Commanders of the Order of Saints Maurice and Lazarus
1822 births
1892 deaths